Arriva MAX is a premium brand used by various Arriva bus subsidiaries in the United Kingdom.

History
In September 2014, Arriva launched the MAX brand for interurban express services. The first services were launched by Arriva North East, which is cited as the creator and home of the brand (alongside jointly managed Arriva Yorkshire), with routes X10 and X11 from Newcastle to Blyth using refurbished double-deck vehicles.

The brand was additionally rolled out by Arriva Buses Wales, Arriva Shires & Essex and Arriva Southern Counties, all of which have since discontinued the brand. Arriva North East and Arriva Yorkshire increased the number of MAX branded routes within their regions. Most of the new routes were launched with Titan the Robot, to celebrate and create interest in each upgrade. 

The MAX brand has been scaled back significantly in recent years as part of the Arriva rebrand, however some routes were withdrawn or were upgraded with new standard or refurbished Arriva Sapphire buses.

Routes
As at October 2022, there were 10 remaining Arriva MAX routes.

Arriva North East 

 X12 - Middlesbrough to Newcastle via Durham
 X26/X27 - Darlington to Richmond and Catterick
 X46 - Durham to Crook
 X66 - Darlington to Middlesbrough
 X75/X76 - Darlington to Barnard Castle
 306 - Newcastle to Whitley Bay via Tynemouth

Arriva Yorkshire 

 202/203 - Leeds to Huddersfield via Dewsbury

Former routes

Arriva Southern Counties
 5 - Southend to Basildon, withdrawn in September 2016 due to a lack of patronage, existing First Essex routes replaced it
 34/35 - Guildford to Camberley via Westfield, Mayford and Sutton Green, Upgraded to Arriva Sapphire.

Arriva The Shires 

 60/X60 - Milton Keynes to Aylesbury
 150 - Milton Keynes to Aylesbury via Leighton Buzzard
 300 - Aylesbury to High Wycombe via Princes Risborough
 800/850 - High Wycombe to Reading

Arriva North East
 X1 - Darlington to Crook via Bishop Auckland, removed from the MAX brand with buses now carrying the Arriva logo in its place.
 X7/X8 - Newcastle to Blyth via Quorum Business Park, removed from the MAX brand with buses now carrying the Arriva logo in its place.
 X9/X10/X11 - Newcastle to Blyth via Cramlington, removed from the MAX brand with buses now carrying the Arriva logo in its place.
 X14 - Newcastle to Thropton via Morpeth, removed from the MAX brand following delivery of new buses in the standard livery.
 X15/X18 - Newcastle to Berwick via Morpeth and Alnwick, removed from the MAX brand following delivery of new buses in the standard livery.
 X16 - Newcastle to Kirkhill Estate via Morpeth, withdrawn and replaced in part by an extended route 2.
 X20 - Newcastle to Alnwick via Ashington, removed from the MAX brand following delivery of new buses in the standard livery.
 X67 - Darlington to Middlesbrough, withdrawn and replaced with revised route X66.
 X93/X94 - Middlesbrough to Scarborough via Whitby, removed from the MAX brand following refurbishment and rebrand of existing vehicles.
 308 - Newcastle to Blyth, following a change in vehicle allocation, the initial vehicles (Wright Gemini 2-bodied Volvo B5LHs) were transferred to Arriva Yorkshire, in return for unrefurbished Wright Gemini 2-bodied VDL DB300s which were later refurbished to the new standard Arriva livery and specification.

Arriva Yorkshire
 415 - York to Selby, upgraded to Arriva Sapphire.
 229 - Leeds to Huddersfield, upgraded to Arriva Sapphire.
 444 - Leeds to Wakefield

Vehicles

MAX branded vehicles have leather seats, free WiFi and a modified livery, some also include charging points (standard from early-2016), furthermore some buses also include air conditioning. Initially only refurbished vehicles were used with Arriva North East and Arriva Yorkshire opting for Wright Gemini 2 bodied VDL DB300s.

Since then, Arriva North East have also refurbished Scania OmniCitys and Alexander Dennis Enviro400s and more recently have purchased brand new stock in the form of further Alexander Dennis Enviro400s, Wright StreetLites and Volvo B9TLs. Meanwhile, Arriva Yorkshire has refurbished a mixture of Wright Gemini 2/VDL DB300s and Alexander Dennis Enviro400s as well as purchasing new Alexander Dennis Enviro400s. Elsewhere, Arriva Shires & Essex have refurbished Mercedes-Benz Citaros while Arriva Buses Wales have refurbished Wright Pulsar bodied VDL SB200s

See also
 Arriva Sapphire
 Stagecoach Gold

References

Max
Bus transport brands
Luxury brands
2014 establishments in the United Kingdom